Pietro Avoscani (born 1816 in Livorno; died 1 March 1891 in Alexandria) was an Italian architect. He emigrated to Egypt in 1837.

Buildings
 Palace of Gabbar, 1846–48
 Ras el-Tin Palace, 1847
 Palaces of Abbasiyya and Hilmiyya 1849
 Palaces of Gazira and Chubra, 1860–61
 Khedivial Opera House, 1869
 International Market of Minia al-Bassal/Bourse of Minet el Bassal, 1871
 Zizinia theatre/Theatre Zizinia, 1863

Notes

Sources

External links
 Pietro Avoscani

People from Livorno
19th-century Italian architects
Architects from Tuscany
Egyptian architects
1816 births
1891 deaths